The second season of the American television comedy series Rules of Engagement premiered on September 24, 2007, and concluded on May 19, 2008. It consists of 15 episodes, each running approximately 22 minutes in length. CBS broadcast the second season on Mondays at 9:30 pm in the United States.  No new episodes of the program aired between December and March, due to the 2007-2008 Writers Guild of America strike.

Cast

Main cast
 Patrick Warburton as Jeff Bingham
 Megyn Price as Audrey Bingham
 Oliver Hudson as Adam Rhodes
 Bianca Kajlich as Jennifer Morgan
 David Spade as Russell Dunbar

Episodes

Ratings

References

2007 American television seasons
2008 American television seasons